Events in the year 1972 in Brazil.

Incumbents

Federal government
 President: General Emílio Médici 
 Vice President: 	General Augusto Rademaker

Governors 
 Acre: vacant
 Alagoas: Afrânio Lages
 Amazonas: João Walter de Andrade
 Bahia: Antônio Carlos Magalhães 
 Ceará: César Cals 
 Espírito Santo: Artur Carlos Gerhardt Santos 
 Goiás: Leonino Caiado 
 Guanabara: Antonio de Pádua Chagas Freitas
 Maranhão: Pedro Neiva de Santana 
 Mato Grosso: José Fragelli 
 Minas Gerais: Rondon Pacheco 
 Pará: Fernando Guilhon 
 Paraíba: Ernâni Sátiro 
 Paraná: Pedro Viriato Parigot de Sousa 
 Pernambuco: Eraldo Gueiros 
 Piauí: Alberto Silva
 Rio de Janeiro: Raimundo Padhila
 Rio Grande do Norte: Jose Pereira de Araújo Cortez 
 Rio Grande do Sul: Euclides Triches 
 Santa Catarina: Colombo Salles 
 São Paulo: Laudo Natel 
 Sergipe: Paulo Barreto de Menezes

Vice governors
 Acre: Alberto Barbosa da Costa 
 Alagoas: José de Medeiros Tavares 
 Amazonas: Deoclides de Carvalho Leal 
 Bahia: Menandro Minahim 
 Ceará: Francisco Humberto Bezerra
 Espírito Santo: Henrique Pretti 
 Goiás: Ursulino Tavares Leão 
 Maranhão: Alexandre Sá Colares Moreira 
 Mato Grosso: José Monteiro de Figueiredo 
 Minas Gerais: Celso Porfírio de Araújo Machado 
 Pará: Newton Burlamaqui Barreira 
 Paraíba: Clóvis Bezerra Cavalcanti 
 Paraná: vacant
 Pernambuco: José Antônio Barreto Guimarães 
 Piauí: Sebastião Rocha Leal 
 Rio de Janeiro: Teotônio Araújo
 Rio Grande do Norte: Tertius Rebelo 
 Rio Grande do Sul: Edmar Fetter 
 Santa Catarina: Atílio Francisco Xavier Fontana 
 São Paulo: Antonio José Rodrigues Filho  
 Sergipe: Adalberto Moura

Births
4 February – Giovanni Silva de Oliveira, footballer
27 May – Ivete Sangalo, Brazilian singer-songwriter, actress and television show host
30 June – Fabiano Scherner, German-Brazilian mixed martial artist and jiu-jitsu black belt
28 September – Guta Stresser, actress

Deaths

References

See also 
1972 in Brazilian football
1973 in Brazilian television

 
1970s in Brazil
Years of the 20th century in Brazil
Brazil
Brazil